Bensinger is a surname. Notable people with the surname include:

Amalie Bensinger (1809–1889), German painter 
Graham Bensinger (born 1986), American television sports reporter
Jörg Bensinger, German engineer
Moses Bensinger (1839–1904), American merchant and manufacturer
Peter B. Bensinger (born 1936), American government official
Richard Bensinger, American author, American labor activist and labor consultant 
Tyler Bensinger, American film and television writer, producer and film director
William Bensinger (1840–1918), American soldier